Thaumatichthyidae, the wolftrap anglers, is a small family of deep-sea anglerfishes, containing two genera and eight species found in all oceans. They are commonly known as wolftrap anglers or wolftrap seadevils because of their distinctive upper jaws with movable premaxillaries that can be lowered to form a cage-like trap around the much shorter lower jaw. They are related to (and were formerly placed within) the family Oneirodidae.

References

 
Deep sea fish
Marine fish families